The county governor of Rogaland county in Norway represents the central government administration in the county.

Stavanger amt was established in 1671. In 1838, the border between Stavanger amt and neighboring Lister og Mandals amt was moved slightly to the west to accommodate the new municipal structure that was set forth in the formannskapsdistrikt law. In 2002, the municipality of Ølen was transferred into the county.

The county governor is the government's representative in the county. The governor carries out the resolutions and guidelines of the Storting and government. This is done first by the county governor performing administrative tasks on behalf of the ministries. Secondly, the county governor also monitors the activities of the municipalities and is the appeal body for many types of municipal decisions.

Names
The word for county (amt or fylke) has changed over time. On 1 January 2021, the title was again changed to the gender-neutral .

List of county governors
Rogaland county has had the following governors:

References

Rogaland
County governor